The Meghalaya football team is an Indian football team representing Meghalaya in Indian state football competitions including the  Santosh Trophy.

Squad
The following 23 players were called for the 2022–23 Santosh Trophy.

Honours 
 Santosh Trophy
 Runners-up (1): 2022–23

National Games
 Bronze medal (1): 2007

 B.C. Roy Trophy
 Winners (1): 1988–89

 Mir Iqbal Hussain Trophy
 Winners (3): 2012–13, 2017–18, 2019–20
 Runners-up (2): 2004–05, 2016–17

References

Santosh Trophy teams
Football in Meghalaya